Boris Vasilyevich Gusakov (January 1, 1938 – December 27, 1970), known as The Student Hunter, was a Soviet serial killer convicted for the killing of 6 people in the Moscow area between 1964 and 1968. Gusakov, a serial rapist with a history of mental health issues, committed 6 murders and 15 violent sexual assaults on girls and young women before being caught, and was executed by firing squad in 1970.

Background
Boris Vasilevich Gusakov was born in 1938, in the Saltykovka district of Balashikha, Moscow Oblast, Soviet Union. Gusakov was born into a family of alcoholics, and suffered from mental health issues from an early age, but these were often ignored due to the ongoing World War II. At the age of 3, Gusakov witnessed an eerie scene: a bomb dropped by the Germans killed several people, including a teenage girl who had her head blown off. Later on, during interrogations, Gusakov said that while committing attacks on his victims, he wanted to relive the scene he had seen in his childhood.

In 1955 he graduated from the school, but did not enter higher education, and began working as a photographer. Gusakov married a librarian in 1958, and a daughter was born. He treated his daughter cruelly, and tortured her. From 1958 to 1961, Gusakov served in the Soviet Army, and shortly after his discharge from the army he was convicted for theft. From May 1962 to July 1965 he worked as a photographer at the factory "Kartolitografii" GAPU, where he was viewed positively by his colleagues. From August 1965 to July 1966 he worked at a laboratory for the film and photo department of the Ministry of Internal Affairs. From January 1967 to January 1968 he worked as a photographic engineer at an oncology and chemical research facility, but was fired for violating labor discipline.

From February 1 to February 23, 1968, he worked as a chauffeur at the motor depot of the Moscow Post Office. From February to May 1968, he had no permanent job and survived by doing odd jobs. Until May 14, he worked at the Moscow Children's Distribution Receiver of the UOOP of the Moscow Executive Committee, as the head of the darkroom operations.

Murders
At the end of December 1963, the 25-year-old Boris Gusakov launched his first attack on a girl at the Moscow Institute of History and Archives. He was unsuccessful, however, as the victim resisted and broke free. When the child ran out into a yard, an outfit of the Komsomol fighting squad tried to detain the attacker, but he disappeared. At that time, it was suggested that the attack was carried out by another killer: Vladimir Ionesyan, the "Mosgaz" killer, who operated in Moscow in late 1963.

On June 21, 1964, in the Tomilinsky Forest Park located in the Lyuberetsky District, Gusakov committed his first murder. He raped and killed 11-year-old Valya Scherbakova, striking her several times on the head with a blunt object. On September 4, 1965, Gusakov raped and killed his second victim, a student named Yanova, again in the Tomilinsky Forest Park. By 1968, when he began his new murder series, the cases of his first murders had been classified.

On March 11, 1968, Gusakov raped and killed two first-year female students, Olga Romanova and Elena Krasovskaya in the attic of the Moscow Power Engineering Institute. There he left the murder weapon - a scrap from a steel water pipe - with his fingerprints on it. It turned out that the last time the girls were seen was with their classmate Oleg Ryabkov, but his fingerprints did not match those found on the murder weapon. On the wall of the attic an inscription addressed to the murders was found, mentioning an Igor and Sergey. The investigators located the two young men mentioned, but their fingerprints did not coincide as well.

In April 1968, Gusakov killed another 9-year-old girl, attacking a couple afterwards. During the attack, he hit the man with a blunt object and then killed the woman. However, the man survived and was able to describe his attacker. Since both crimes were committed in the Lyuberetsky District, the detectives decided to investigate all similar attacks in recent years. They then discovered that the murders of Scherbakova and Yanova were committed by the same criminal, as well of the murders of the three girls in the spring of 1968.

Arrest and conviction
On 16 May 1968, Gusakov met two tenth-grade girls in Serpukhov, Moscow Oblast, who he invited to go with him to the countryside. At first he tried to poison then kill them with a cleaver, but when Gusakov tried to attack the girls they escaped, where they alerted a nearby policeman who detained Gusakov.

In 1969, a court found Gusakov guilty of five murders and he was sentenced to death. Despite several requests for clemency which were all rejected, in 1970 Gusakov was executed by firing squad in Moscow.

In the media
 The documentary film "Beauties and the Beast" from "The Investigation was conducted..." series, on NTV.

See also
 List of Russian serial killers

References

Bibliography
 Robert Kalman,  Born to Kill in the USSR, FriesenPress, 2014,  ; Chapter 'Student hunter', pp. 53–59
 Alina Maximova - "Boris Gusakov, the Student Hunter"

1938 births
1970 deaths
20th-century executions by Russia
20th-century Russian criminals
Executed people from Moscow Oblast
Executed Russian people
Executed Soviet serial killers
Male serial killers
People convicted of murder by Russia
People convicted of murder by the Soviet Union
People executed by the Soviet Union by firearm
People from Balashikha
Russian people convicted of murder
Russian people executed by the Soviet Union
Russian murderers of children
Russian rapists
Russian serial killers
Soviet murderers of children
Soviet people convicted of murder
Soviet rapists
Violence against women in Russia